Munmun Akhter Liza (better known as Moyuri on stage) (born December 6, 1983) is a Bangladeshi film actress. She made her film debut in 1998 with the film 'Mrityur Mukhe'. Since then, she has acted in about 309 films until 2007. Nargis Akhter's movie ' Char Satiner Ghar ' based on author Selina Hossain 's novel 'Hridoy O Shramer Sansar' playing the role of Khan Shaheb's third wife further enhanced her reputation. Pornography flourished at the time, and in its aftermath, Moyuri also starred in a number of "obscene" films, and was widely criticized for her obscenity and nudity. Since then, her interest in cinema has waned, which is why she has not been seen in films since 2007.

Personal life 
Moyuri's real name is Munmun Akhter Liza. Born on 7 December 1983 in Rampura Dhaka. While in ninth grade, she became involved with the film industry.

She married Rezaul Karim Milon, an upazila vice-chairman, in 2007. They have a daughter named Maimuna Saiba Angel from the marriage. In 2015 her husband died at the age of 45. In 2017, she married a madrasa teacher named Shafiq Jewel Ahmed. She gave birth to her second child, Sheikh Saad Muhammad Insafh, on 23 February 2019.

Career 
In 1997, Moyuri entered the world of acting through the film 'Mrityur Mukhe'  by a producer named Mahmud. Then her acting life moved forward very fast. She made a lot of names in one movie after another.

She rose to fame by playing the role of Alamgir's wife in the film Char Satiner Ghar directed by Nargis Akhter.

In her career she was a member of a circus troupe called the New Opera Circus.

Films 
 Mrittur Mukhe (1997)
 Moger Mullok (1999)
 Ke Amar Baba (1999)
 Hira Chuni Panna (2000)
 Dujon Dujonar (2000)
 Kukhato Khuni (2000)
 Voyonkor Sontrasi (2001)
 Rongbaz Badshah (2001)
 Dhakaiya Mastan (2002)
 Arman (2002)
 Mastaner Upor Mastan (2002)
 Aghat Palta Aghat (2002)
 Keyamot (2003)
 Hingsha Protihingsha (2003)
 Bir Soinik (2003)
 Kothin Simar (2003)
 Dui Bodhu Ek Shami (2003)
 Vaiyer Sotru Vai (2004)
 Char Satiner Ghar (2005)
 Hira Amar Naam (2005)
 Nirapatta Chai (2005)
 Vondo Ojha (2006)
 Tumi Amar Shami (2006)
 Top Samrat
 Bangla Vai
 Palta Hamla
 Lohar Shikol
 Moron Nishan
 Bahadur Sontan
 Juddhe Jabo
 Kosom Banglar Mati

Criticism 
Mayuri was widely criticized for her open dress and indecent acting. She is called the heroine of pornographic films.

References

External links 

Bangladeshi film actresses
1983 births
Living people